Two Hong Kong railway companies merged operations in 2007: the Kowloon-Canton Railway  (KCR) and the Mass Transit Railway (MTR).

Background
There had already been some discussion of merging the KCRC itself, which was also government-owned, and the MTR to make the territory's transport system more efficient. The MTR Corporation Limited (MTRCL) backed such a merge while the KCRC opposed the plan. In March 2004, the Hong Kong Government officially encouraged the two companies to merge.

On 11 April 2006, the Hong Kong Government officially announced the details of the proposed merger. Under the non-binding Memorandum of Understanding the Government has signed with KCRC, KCRC would grant a Service Concession to the MTRCL to operate the KCR system, with an initial period of 50 years. The KCRC would receive a one-time upfront payment of HK$4.25 billion, a fixed annual payment of HK$750 million and a variable annual payment based on revenues generated from operation of the KCR system. In addition, MTRCL would make a payment of $7.79 billion for the acquisition of property and other related commercial interests.

The railway lines the KCRC operated were less profitable than the MTRC, and the KCRC was less active in property development. It was widely considered that the Government's choice was made to avoid being criticised for selling assets of the KCRCwhich it wholly ownedto MTRCL at an underpriced level. Leasing the operation right of the KCR system to the MTRCL could avoid actually selling the KCRC.

On 2 December 2007, the Chinese name of the MTRCL was changed to  after being granted the Service Concession while the English name will remain unchanged. The KCRC became a holding company of the KCR system, without actual railway operations. 

The merger, effective for 50 years, was approved by shareholders of the MTRCL on 9 October 2007. This also resulted in changing the system's Chinese name from "地鐵" ("Subway") to "港鐵" ("Hong Kong Railway").

Fare reductions
All adult Octopus Card holders were the first to benefit from the merger. Student and Concessionary Octopus holders also benefited from the merger by further reducing $0.1 from their 50% off fares. Student Octopus holders would continue to pay the current reduced concessionary fares on the MTR network. Elderly Octopus holders would be introduced to a new fare system which only the elderly can enjoy a $2 fare to anywhere on the MTR network (excluding Airport Express, Light Rail, and Cross-Boundary Stations).

References 

Transport in Hong Kong
MTR
Kowloon–Canton Railway
2007 in rail transport